The Sparks 300 was a NASCAR Xfinity Series race at Talladega Superspeedway. It is one of two Xfinity races at the superspeedway alongside the Ag-Pro 300.

The event was created in 2020 as a temporary round after the Mid-Ohio Sports Car Course race was canceled due to the COVID-19 pandemic; the inaugural running marked the first time that the Xfinity Series raced at Talladega in the fall. Justin Haley won the race to complete a sweep of the season's Talladega rounds. The race joined the Xfinity schedule in 2021 and is the second race in the series' playoffs.

A. J. Allmendinger is the defending race winner. The race was held in support of the NASCAR Cup Series' YellaWood 500.

When the 2023 schedules were released, it was announced that the race would not return to the Xfinity schedule.

Past winners

Notes 
2020: Race moved from Mid-Ohio Sports Car Course due to COVID-19 pandemic.
2021: Race shortened due to darkness after a lengthy red flag due to track repairs.

References

External links
 

2020 establishments in Alabama
NASCAR Xfinity Series races
 
Recurring sporting events established in 2020
Annual sporting events in the United States